Dr Yunupingu may refer to:

Galarrwuy Yunupingu (born 1948), Australian leader in the struggle for Indigenous land rights in Australia
Geoffrey Gurrumul Yunupingu (1971–2017), aka Gurrumul, Australian multi-instrumentalist and singer 
Mandawuy Yunupingu (1956–2013), Australian musician, educator and community leader

See also
Dr Yunupingu Award for Human Rights, one of three awards at the National Indigenous Human Rights Awards, named for Mandawuy Yunupingu